The Trademark Trial and Appeal Board (TTAB) is an administrative tribunal within the United States Patent and Trademark Office (USPTO).   The TTAB is empowered to determine the right to register a trademark. It has no authority to determine the right to use one, nor broader questions of infringement, unfair competition, damages or injunctive relief. The TTAB decides ex parte appeals from decisions by USPTO Examiners denying registration of marks, and inter partes proceedings challenging the registration of marks. Decisions of the TTAB may be appealed to a United States district court, or to the United States Court of Appeals for the Federal Circuit.

Practices and procedures for litigating before the TTAB are governed by the Trademark Rules of Practice and the Federal Rules of Civil Procedure. The Trademark Trial and Appeal Board Manual of Procedure (TBMP) is an important guide to practice before the TTAB.

Judges of the TTAB

The Administrative Trademark Judges of the Trademark Trial and Appeal Board (TTAB) are appointed by the United States Secretary of Commerce in consultation with the director of the USPTO. Each appeal and adversarial proceeding is heard and decided by at least three judges of the TTAB. There are currently twenty-five judges sitting at the TTAB (as of September 2022), as follows:

See also
Electronic System for Trademark Trials and Appeals
Trademark Trial and Appeal Board Manual of Procedure
Trademarks Opposition Board, the equivalent body in Canada

References

External links
 
 The TTABlog – Keeping Tabs on the TTAB (Blog by John L. Welch, a Harvard-educated intellectual property attorney and frequent lecturer on TTAB practices and procedures)

United States trademark law
Article I tribunals
United States Patent and Trademark Office
Courts and tribunals with year of establishment missing